Shem Marton (born 20 February 1995) is an Indian professional footballer who plays as a midfielder for Three Star Club in the Martyr's Memorial A-Division League.

Career

India
Shem's football career began in his hometown where he played for a club representing his area in the Thiruvananthapuram League. After that, he played for Sethu FC which is based in Madurai and was a part of Madurai League.
After a few good performances, he moved to Chennai to play for Viva Chennai in the CFA Senior Division. Later he moved to another Chennai based side Chennai City FC, that competes in the I-League.

He was captain of the Tamil Nadu U-19 team, He have also played for MS University, Anna University and he narrowly missed out on making the Tamil Nadu football team for the Santosh Trophy because of an injury.

He made his professional debut for the Chennai City F.C. against Aizawl F.C. on 16 November 2018, He was brought in 90th minute as Chennai City won 1–2.

Nepal
On 8 November 2021, Shem moved to Nepal and signed with Chyasal Youth Club.

He later moved to Three Star Club in December, during the 2021–22 Martyr's Memorial A-Division League season. He debuted for Three Star on 18 December against New Road Team.

Career statistics

See also
 List of Indian football players in foreign leagues

References

External links
Shem Marton Eugene at the-aiff.com

1995 births
Living people
People from Thiruvananthapuram
Indian footballers
Chennai City FC players  
Footballers from Kerala
I-League players
Association football midfielders
Indian expatriate footballers
Expatriate footballers in Nepal